Ferdon is a surname. Notable people with the surname include:

Edwin Ferdon (1913–2002), American ethnologist
John W. Ferdon (1826–1884), American politician
William Ferdon House

French-language surnames